Donja Paklenica is a village in the municipality of Doboj, Bosnia and Herzegovina.

References

Populated places in Doboj
Villages in Republika Srpska